Bullerjahn is a surname. Notable people with the surname include:

 George S. Bullerjahn, American microbiologist
 Jens Bullerjahn (1962–2022), German engineer and politician

Surnames of German origin